The Battles of Dijon were a series of battles that took place in 1870 and 1871, as part of the Franco-Prussian War, on the current territory of the French commune of Dijon between the French Republic and the German states of Prussia and Baden and later, the German Empire.

Background
The Franco-Prussian War, which started on July 19, 1870, begins with a rapid succession of French defeats: the evacuation of northern Alsace with defeats at Wissembourg and Wörth), the capitulation of Marshal Bazaine in Metz at the Battle of Gravelotte, the defeat and capture of Emperor Napoleon III at the Battle of Sedan, his capitulation on September 2. The Germanic armies invaded all of eastern France and opened up the road to Paris. The Republic is proclaimed on September 4 and the provisional government decides, under the impetus of Léon Gambetta, in charge of the new Government of National Defense, for the continuation of the war.

First Battle of Dijon
From the start of the Siege of Paris (September 19, 1870 - January 20, 1871 ), French strategy focused on harassing actions against Prussian troops established in the east of the country, to reduce pressure on the capital such as the Battles of Strasbourg and Metz.

The troops still available in the east, supported by local defense committees raised after the defeats of the summer, were invited to start a "partisan war". Thus were born the corps of the "francs tireurs", corps of volunteers of variable entity, which would have constituted, with the Italian Garibaldians, the heart of the army of Garibaldi, in a few months. Their coordination with the rest of the regular troops was not at all easy and, from September 11, the government sought to integrate them into the ranks of the regulars, with some setbacks.

The beginning of the battle on October 30, 1870, the very expression of the difficulties in applying a strategy and the deep disorganization of the French armed forces. After the capitulation of Sedan and while laying siege around Paris, the Prussians consolidated their conquests in the East. On October 17, General Von Werder's troops occupied Luxeuil and Vesoul, and on the 26th Gray , and on the 27th they marched towards Dijon, barely delayed by the Garde Mobile who had positioned themselves to defend the passage of the Vingeanne. French Colonel Fauconnet's troops were forced to give up defending the town and fall back on Beaune. On the 29th, the prefect and the mayor of the city, under pressure from the population, demanded their return. Local volunteers engaged in combat against two brigades of the Baden army and vanguards of the Prussian Army. The fighting continued all day through October 30 on the heights of Montmusard and in the eastern suburbs of Dijon, in particular in Jeannin Street. Colonel Adrien François Louis Fauconnet, returned from Beaune with a few thousand men and was seriously wounded there while he was attempting a counter-offensive on Gray Road, in front of the granting barrier, and died a few hours later, after having taken knowledge of the decree which appointed him general. Around five o'clock in the evening, the municipality had the white flag hoisted on the tower of the Palace, not without the man in charge of this mission having first suffered shots from supporters of the resistance to the extreme. After negotiations carried out overnight in Varois, the city was occupied the next day. One hundred and sixty combatants had given their lives to defend it.

Second Battle of Dijon

Meanwhile, Giuseppe Garibaldi arrived in Marseille on October 7, to help the Republic which had succeeded the Second French Empire of Napoleon III , whose armies had defeated it in Rome in 1849 and at the Battle of Mentana in 1867. In mid-October, the general was charged by the provisional government to organize an army in the east of France (it is in Dole theOctober 13). This is a mission similar to that carried out between the Lombard lakes in 1848 and 1859, and to operations in Trentino in 1866: to act in a secondary area of operations but with a significant strategic role.

The army was made up of colonials, national guards from Aveyron , the Alpes-Maritimes and Savoie , Frankish corps (east and south-east of France), foreign volunteers (Polish, Hungarian, Spanish, Americans and, above all, Italians ): was initially less than 4,000 men. Garibaldi was assisted by his sons Menotti and Ricciotti, his son-in-law Canzio and Joseph Bordone, an Avignonnais of Italian origin who had followed Garibaldi in the Expedition of the Thousand, and who was for the occasion promoted general and chief of staff .

From the following month, Garibaldi set up his own headquarters in Autun, and began attacks on the Prussian army, disrupting logistics lines from Strasbourg to Paris, with some success from the victorious shock of Châtillon-sur-Seine in November 19, when Ricciotti Garibaldi took 200 prisoners with the convoys of arms and ammunition. On November 26 however was failed attempt to invade Dijon whom was occupied by the Prussians.

The battle took place on December 18, in the plain which extends in front of the town of Nuits-Saint-Georges, when the Germans hooked up the volunteers who barred their way to the south. After a day of fighting, the Frankish corps retreated: around 1,200 French prisoners, 97 German officers shot dead, Prince Wilhelm wounded, the overall losses amounting to a few hundred men. The Prussians captured the fugitives on the roads of the village, except the survivors sheltered by the population, who dressed them in civilian clothes. The victors looted the hospital, the shops, the inns, set fire to buildings and sifted through the city house by house.

Third Battle of Dijon
On January 14, 1871, Garibaldi settled in Dijon, evacuated by the Prussians on December 17, whom were informed of the arrival towards the north of French regular troops led by Charles-Denis Bourbaki.

Bourbaki attempted an ambitious operation to liberate Paris by taking the enemy troops from the rear, through a vast strategic movement from Bourges to Alsace via Belfort. This desperate attempt followed the two previous ones led by the Army of the Loire and the Army of the North. Garibaldi then led from Dijon a series of initiatives to support the main offensive.

In the meantime, the situation was precipitating. The army of Paris failed in its efforts, while The retreat of Bourbaki towards Besançon was interrupted by the Germans of General Edwin von Manteuffel and pushed towards the Swiss border, mainly at Verrières-de-Joux on January 31. The 84,000 men still in arms out of the 150,000 parties were disarmed and interned in the Confederation by the Verrières Convention.

Following the retreat of Bourbaki's main army, Garibaldi reduced his action to the defense of Dijon and the "gates of Burgundy", preventing the enemy from advancing south. On January 21, 22 and 23, 1871, Dijon was attacked by 4,000 Prussians. Garibaldi emerged victorious and on January 23, captured a flag from the 61st Pomeranian Regiment. Polish General Jozef Bossak-Hauké , who commanded the First Brigade, was killed during this battle.

Aftermath
The provisional government began negotiations for the armistice, signed on the 29th of January. The armistice excludes the department of Dijon, the Prussians wanting to humiliate Garibaldi and the corps of volunteers.

Dijon remained occupied by the German army, from January 18, until October 28, 1871.

On March 8, 1871, in front of a particularly stormy National Assembly which was hostile to Garibaldi, Victor Hugo thus celebrated Garibaldi's venture into Dijon:

"Of all these European powers, none rose to defend this France which, so many times, had taken the cause of Europe in hand ... not a king, not a state, no one! Only one man except. Where the powers, as they say, didn't interfere, well a man stepped in, and that man is a power. This man, gentlemen, what did he have? His sword. [...] His sword, and this sword had already delivered one people ... And this sword could save another. He thought so; he came, he fought. Interruptions will not prevent me from completing my thought. He fought ... I don't want to hurt anyone in this Assembly, but I will say that he is the only one, of the generals who fought for France, the only one who was not defeated. [...] I ask to finish. [...] I will satisfy you, Gentlemen, and go further than you. Three weeks ago you refused to hear Garibaldi. Today you refuse to hear me. It's enough for me. I hand in my resignation"

References

Bibliography
 Alain Fauconnier, La Bataille de Nuits (roman historique), Editions de l'Armançon, 2012

1870 in France
Dijon
Dijon
Dijon
Dijon
October 1870 events
Dijon
Giuseppe Garibaldi